Sandra Záhlavová was the defending champion, but lost in the Quarterfinals to Magda Linette.

Yvonne Meusburger won the title, defeating Elitsa Kostova in the final, 0–6, 6–2, 6–0.

Seeds

Main draw

Finals

Top half

Bottom half

References 
 Main draw
 Qualifying draw

Empire Trnava Cup - Singles